The canton of Clisson is an administrative division of the Loire-Atlantique department, western France. Its borders were modified at the French canton reorganisation which came into effect in March 2015. Its seat is in Clisson.

It consists of the following communes:
 
Aigrefeuille-sur-Maine
Boussay
Clisson
Gétigné
Gorges
Maisdon-sur-Sèvre
Monnières
La Planche
Remouillé
Saint-Hilaire-de-Clisson
Saint-Lumine-de-Clisson
Vieillevigne

References

Cantons of Loire-Atlantique